Romanówka may refer to the following places:
Romanówka, Chełm County in Lublin Voivodeship (east Poland)
Romanówka, Siemiatycze County in Podlaskie Voivodeship (north-east Poland)
Romanówka, Sokółka County in Podlaskie Voivodeship (north-east Poland)
Romanówka, Suwałki County in Podlaskie Voivodeship (north-east Poland)
Romanówka, Łódź Voivodeship (central Poland)
Romanówka, Tomaszów Lubelski County in Lublin Voivodeship (east Poland)
Romanówka, Świętokrzyskie Voivodeship (south-central Poland)